Michael Klauß may refer to:

 Michael Klauß (footballer, born 1970), German footballer
 Michael Klauß (footballer, born 1987), German footballer